Giffords Hall (also called Gifford's Hall) is a Tudor manor house near Stoke-by-Nayland in Suffolk, England. It was described by Nikolaus Pevsner as “one of the loveliest houses of its date in England”. It is one of two houses in Suffolk formerly owned by the Gifford family in the 13th century, the other being Gifford's Hall, Wickhambrook.

Architecture
The current house is a mainly 16th Century house built for the Mannock family, incorporating older fabric. It has a hall with a hammerbeam roof and a Tudor brick gatehouse incorporating medieval fragments.

Gallery

References

Grade I listed buildings in Suffolk
Grade I listed houses
Stoke-by-Nayland